Caloptilia behrensella is a moth of the family Gracillariidae. It is known from the United States (California).

References

behrensella
Moths of North America
Moths described in 1876